Numerous castles and palaces are found in the German state of Lower Saxony. These buildings, some of which have a history of over 1000 years, were the setting of historical events, domains of famous personalities and are still imposing buildings to this day.

This list encompasses those structures built as fortified sites, usually described in German as a Burg (castle or manor house) or Festung (fort/fortress), as well as those built primarily as aristocratic residences - stately homes and palaces - usually referred to in German as a Schloß or Palais/Palast.

 Agathenburg House, Agathenburg
 Ahlden House, Ahlden
 Alte Burg, Osterode am Harz
 Adelebsen Castle, Adelebsen
 Ampleben Castle, Kneitlingen
 Jagdschloss Baum, Bückeburg
 Bederkesa Castle, Bad Bederkesa
 Beningaburg, Dornum
 Bredebeck House, Lohheide
 Bentheim Castle, Bad Bentheim
 Bevern Castle, Bevern
 Blankenburg Castle, Essel
 Blankenhagen Castle, Grethem
 Bodenwerder Castle, Bodenwerder (Baron von Münchhausen)
 Bramburg, Hann. Münden
 Brunswick Palace, Brunswick
 Bückeburg Castle, Bückeburg
 Bunkenburg, Ahlden
 Calenberg Castle, near Schulenburg
 Campen Castle, Flechtorf
 Celle Castle, Celle
 Coppenbrügge Castle, Coppenbrügge
 Dankern Castle, Haren (Ems)
 Dinklage Castle, Dinklage
 Dannsee Castle, Beckdorf
 Dankwarderode Castle, Brunswick
 Diepholz Castle, Diepholz
 Erichsburg, Dassel
 Essenrode Manor, Essenrode
 Evenburg, Leer
 Everstein Castle, Polle
 Fallersleben Castle, Wolfsburg-Fallersleben
 Frauenstein Castle, Bad Lauterberg
 Freudenthal Ruins, Uslar
 Gifhorn Castle, Gifhorn
 Burg Gleichen, Appenrode
 Gleichen, Göttingen
 Gödens Castle, Neustadtgödens, Sande
 Greene Castle, Greene
 Grubenhagen Castle, near Einbeck
 Hagenburg Castle, Hagenburg
 Haneburg, Leer
 Hardenberg Castle, Nörten-Hardenberg
 Harderwykenburg, Leer
 Harzburg, Bad Harzburg
 Heldenburg, Einbeck
 Ruins of Heisterburg, Bad Nenndorf
 Heisterschlösschen, Beckedorf
 Herrenhausen Castle, Hanover
 Herzberg Castle, Herzberg am Harz
 Hodenhagen Castle, Hodenhagen
 Holter Burg, Bissendorf
 Homburg, Stadtoldendorf
 Hornburg Castle, Hornburg
 Hoya Castle, Hoya
 Hünenburg, Bad Pyrmont
 Hünenburg, Rinteln
 Hünnefeld Castle, Bad Essen
 Hülsede Water Castle, Hülsede 
 Iburg Castle and Benedictine Abbey, Bad Iburg
 Ippenburg Castle, Bad Essen
 Jever Castle, Jever
 Kukesburg, Springe
 Landestrost Castle, Neustadt am Rübenberge
 Leine Castle, Hanover
 Lauenstein Castle, on the Ith above Lauenstein, Hameln-Pyrmont 
 Burg Lichtenberg, Salzgitter
 Castle ruins of Lichtenstein, Osterode am Harz
 Lutter Castle, Lutter am Barenberge
 Lütetsburg Castle, Lütetsburg
 Manningaburg, Pewsum
 Marienburg Castle, Hildesheim
 Marienburg Castle, Pattensen
 Fort Mariensiel, Wilhelmshaven
 Neuhaus Castle, Wolfsburg-Neuhaus
 Schloss Norderburg, Dornum
 Schloss Oldenburg, Oldenburg
 Oelber Castle, Oelber am weißen Wege
 Osnabrück Castle
 Osterburg, Groothusen, East Frisia
 Petersburg, Osnabrück
 Plesse Castle, Bovenden/Göttingen
 Rastede Castle, Rastede
 Ringelheim Castle and Park, Salzgitter
 Ritzebüttel Castle, Cuxhaven
 Salder Castle, Salzgitter
 Schaumburg, Rinteln
 Scharzfels Castle, Herzberg am Harz
 Schloss Bredebeck, see Bredebeck House
 Schloss Richmond, Brunswick
 Sichelnstein Castle, Sichelnstein
 Siebethsburg, Wilhelmshaven
 Söder Castle, Holle
 Stadthagen Castle, Stadthagen
 Steuerwald Castle, Hildesheim
 Uhlenburg, Essel
 Warberg Castle, Warberg 
 Castle ruins of Warburg, Warberg
 Winsen Castle, Winsen (Luhe)
 Stiftsburg Wittlage, Wittlage
 Welf Castle, Hanover
 Wendhausen Castle, Wendhausen
  Wilhelmstein Fortress, Steinhude
 Winzenburg Castle, Winzenburg
 Wohldenberg Castle, Sillium
 Wolfenbüttel Castle, Wolfenbüttel
 Wolfsburg Castle, Wolfsburg

See also
List of castles
List of castles in Germany

 
Cast

de:Liste von Burgen und Schlössern in Niedersachsen